DBU Bornholm (Bornholm Football Association  until 1 February 2011) is a district branch of the Danish Football Association, DBU Bornholm representing the Danish FA's football clubs on the island of Bornholm. The Danish FA's is a member of both FIFA and UEFA.

DBU Bornholm was founded on 28 March 1907 and is based in Rønne. It is a member of the Association of Local Football Unions in Denmark Foreningen af Lokalunioner i Danmark (FLU) which associated with both the Danish Football Association (DBU) and the Sports Confederation of Denmark (Danmarks Idræts-Forbund, (DIF)). Only clubs based on Bornholm are eligible for membership of DBU Bornholm.

DBU Bornholm is the youngest and smallest of the DBU's district branches, and has a membership of 19 clubs, representing roughly 1.2% of the DBU's total number of football clubs (2005-figures).

External links 
  

This article is a translation of the corresponding article on the Danish Wikipedia, accessed on 22 June 2007.

Born
Sports organizations established in 1907